The 8th Beijing International Film Festival was held in Beijing, China by the Beijing Municipal Government and the China Media Group. The film festival opened on April 15 and lasts until April 22, 2018. The closing ceremony was held in Beijing on April 22, 2018.

The opening film was Ren Pengyuan's drama film A or B and the closing night film was Mongolian-Chinese director Hasi Chaolu's action film Genghis Khan.

The Festival threw the spotlight on LGBT rights in China when Chinese Government censors banned the screening of the Oscar-winning Call Me by Your Name (film), amid growing censorship concerns under the rule of Xi Jinping.

International Jury
The members of the jury for the Tiantan Award were:

 Wong Kar-wai (Hong Kong film director)
 Rob Cohen (American film director)
 Duan Yihong (Chinese actor)
 Jan A. P. Kaczmarek (Polish composer)
 Călin Peter Netzer (Romanian film director)
 Ruben Östlund (Swedish film director)
 Shu Qi (Taiwanese actress)

In Competition
The Tiantan Awards are the highest awards at the festival, which 659 films from 71 countries and regions have entered. A total of 15 films have been shortlisted for the Tiantan Awards.

Winners of Tiantan Awards

See also
 11th Beijing International Film Festival

References

External links
 

Beijing International Film Festival
Beijing International Film Festival
Beijing
Beijing
2010s in Beijing